Westhead is a toponymic surname derived from the village of Westhead in Lancashire, England.

Notable people with this surname include:

 Andy Westhead, member of British pop punk band As It Is
 Barry Westhead (born 1977), English musician and member of the band Starsailor
 Cam Westhead (born 1977), Canadian politician
 David Westhead (born 1963), English actor
 John Westhead (1966–2000), English rugby player
 Joshua Westhead (1807–1877), British politician
 Mark Westhead (born 1975), English footballer
 Paul Westhead (born 1939), American basketball coach
 Rick Westhead (born 1971), Award-Winning Investigative Journalist

English toponymic surnames